Samuel Kekewich may refer to:

 Samuel Trehawke Kekewich (1796–1873), Member of Parliament for Exeter and later for South Devon
 Samuel Kekewich (Sudbury MP) {1657-1700}, Member of Parliament for Sudbury in 1698-70